Atlantomasoreus is a genus of beetles in the family Carabidae, containing the following species:

 Atlantomasoreus desertorum (Escalera, 1914)
 Atlantomasoreus orbipennis (Bedel, 1904)

References

Lebiinae